Jiří "Áda" Pospíšil (9 September 1950 – 13 June 2019) was a Czech basketball player. He was voted to the Czechoslovakian 20th Century Team.

National team career
Pospíšil competed with the senior Czechoslovakian national team in the men's tournament at the 1972, 1976, and 1980 Summer Olympics. He died on 13 June 2019 at age 68. With Czechoslovakia, he also won the bronze medal at the 1977 EuroBasket.

See also
Czechoslovak Basketball League career stats leaders

References

External links
 

1950 births
2019 deaths
Czechoslovak men's basketball players
Olympic basketball players of Czechoslovakia
Basketball players at the 1972 Summer Olympics
Basketball players at the 1976 Summer Olympics
Basketball players at the 1980 Summer Olympics
Sportspeople from Brno
1970 FIBA World Championship players
1978 FIBA World Championship players
Czech men's basketball players